Meagher can refer to:

 Meagher Electronics
 Meagher (surname), people with the surname Meagher
 Meaghers Grant, Nova Scotia